Ludovit Reis (born 1 June 2000) is a Dutch professional footballer who plays as a midfielder for 2. Bundesliga club Hamburger SV.

Club career

Groningen
Reis played in the youth departments of SV Hoofddorp and FC Groningen. In 2017, he signed a contract with Groningen, keeping him in the club until 2020. On 21 September 2017, he made his professional debut for the first team in a Dutch Cup match, starting against USV Hercules. He was substituted off for Ajdin Hrustic in the 59th minute, as the match ended 4–2 to Groningen. 

On 29 October 2017, Reis scored his first first-team goal in the Eredivisie against Sparta Rotterdam. Thereby he became the first player to be born in the 2000s to score in the first division of Dutch football. On 19 November 2017, he received his second yellow card in a match against Vitesse, becoming the youngest player ever in the Eredivisie to be sent off.

Barcelona
After Groningen were knocked out by Vitesse in the 2018–19 Dutch play-offs for European competitions 4–3 on aggregate, Reis signed a five-year contract with FC Barcelona until 2024. Barcelona paid an initial fee of around €3m, which could rise to €8m if various clauses were met. He was assigned to the reserves in Segunda División B, and he made his debut on 25 August 2020 in a 2–0 away win against CF Badalona.

Loan to VfL Osnabrück
On 3 October 2020, Reis joined 2. Bundesliga side VfL Osnabrück on a season-long loan.

Hamburger SV
On 28 June 2021, Reis joined Hamburger SV and signed a four-year contract, with Barcelona retaining 25% of the rights to any future transfer sale.

International career
Reis was born in the Netherlands to Slovak parents which makes him eligible to represent Slovakia internationally. He has played for the Dutch U19 team since 2018, playing five matches in the 2019 UEFA European Under-19 Championship qualifiers.

Career statistics

References

External links
 
 

2000 births
Living people
Footballers from Haarlem
Association football midfielders
Dutch footballers
Dutch people of Slovak descent
Netherlands youth international footballers
FC Groningen players
FC Barcelona Atlètic players
VfL Osnabrück players
Hamburger SV players
Eredivisie players
Derde Divisie players
Segunda División B players
2. Bundesliga players
Bundesliga players
Dutch expatriate footballers
Expatriate footballers in Spain
Expatriate footballers in Germany
Dutch expatriate sportspeople in Spain
Dutch expatriate sportspeople in Germany